Burón is a municipality located in the province of León, Castile and León, Spain. According to the 2010 census (INE), the municipality has a population of 358 inhabitants.

One partially submerged town of the greater community of “comarca de la Montaña de Riaño” where there is now a water reservoir called “Embalse de  Riaño” near one of the reservoir's water sources “Río Elsa”.

Municipalities in the Province of León